Liberal Democrats leadership election may refer to:

 1999 Liberal Democrats leadership election
 2006 Liberal Democrats leadership election
 2007 Liberal Democrats leadership election
 2015 Liberal Democrats leadership election
 2017 Liberal Democrats leadership election
 2019 Liberal Democrats leadership election
 2020 Liberal Democrats leadership election
 2003 Liberal Democrats deputy leadership election
 2006 Liberal Democrats deputy leadership election
 2010 Liberal Democrats deputy leadership election
 2014 Liberal Democrats deputy leadership election
 2017 Liberal Democrats deputy leadership election
 2008 Scottish Liberal Democrats leadership election
 2011 Scottish Liberal Democrats leadership election

See also
 Liberal Democratic Party leadership election (disambiguation)
 Liberal Party leadership election (disambiguation)
 1988 Social and Liberal Democrats leadership election